Belang van Nederland (BVNL) is a political party in the Netherlands, led by Wybren van Haga. It is currently active in the House of Representatives as the independent Van Haga Group. Its three MPs split from Forum for Democracy in August 2021.

History
BVNL was founded by  Wybren van Haga, who had previously been an MP for the People's Party for Freedom and Democracy (VVD) before defecting to Forum for Democracy (FvD). In May 2021, Van Haga announced that he split from FvD in response to a poster it had released which compared the COVID-19 lockdown to the Nazi occupation of the Netherlands. He was joined by two former FvD MPs Hans Smolders and Olaf Ephraim. The group subsequently founded the independent group Groep Van Haga. In August 2021, Van Haga announced his intention to start a new political party.

Ideology
Van Haga claimed that BVNL will be a classical liberal party and "culturally conservative, but classically liberal when it comes to the role of government". BVNL also claims that individual liberty, freedom and the protection of Dutch history, cultural identity, and interests as the main cornerstones of its policies. The party also states that it supports technological advancement, a reformed criminal justice system, more controls on immigration and removal of immigrants with criminal records, and simplified tax codes. BVNL also calls for an end to handing over Dutch sovereignty and political power to the European Union, for referendums on Dutch membership of key EU treaties, and for a vote on Nexit (Dutch withdrawal from the European Union) if polls indicate public support for one. The party also states that the Dutch constitution and laws must come ahead of international law and policies created by supranational bodies. BVNL also calls for a more critical examination of big tech companies, for freedom of speech to be protected and "academic freedom" within universities. The party is also opposed to some of the COVID-19 lockdown measures taken by the Dutch government, arguing that social and economic collateral damage was not taken into proper consideration. Van Haga has described BVNL as less socially conservative on LGBT and gender issues than the FvD and JA21, which also split off from the FvD, and more focused on economic liberalism.

See also  
 Group Otten
 VoorNederland

Notes
 The members of parliament in the House of Representatives are active under the name Groep van Haga.

References 

Political parties in the Netherlands
2021 establishments in the Netherlands
Classical liberal parties
Conservative parties in the Netherlands
Eurosceptic parties in the Netherlands
Liberal parties in the Netherlands
Political parties established in 2021
Belang van Nederland